The 1958–59 Football League season was Birmingham City Football Club's 56th in the Football League and their 32nd in the First Division. After spending the first half of the season towards the bottom of the division, they finished in 9th position in the 22-team division. They entered the 1958–59 FA Cup at the third round proper and lost to Nottingham Forest in the fifth round after two replays. In the Inter-Cities Fairs Cup, Birmingham progressed through two rounds to reach the semi-final, which was not played until the 1959–60 season.

Towards the end of the season, Birmingham and England full-back Jeff Hall contracted polio and died, only 14 days after the last match in which he played. The death of a young, fit, international footballer helped to kick-start widespread public acceptance in Britain of the need for vaccination. Though the disease was generally feared and the Salk vaccine was available, takeup had been slow. In the weeks following Hall's death, and after his widow spoke on television about her loss, demand for immunisation rocketed. Emergency vaccination clinics had to be set up and supplies of vaccine flown in from the United States to cope with the demand.

In January 1958, Pat Beasley joined the club. Beasley had believed he was coming as assistant to manager Arthur Turner, but chairman Harry Morris announced to the press that he was to be appointed joint manager. Turner, who found about this arrangement not from the club but from the press, threatened to resign. He was persuaded to stay "for the time being", but finally left in September 1958, and Beasley took over as manager. Twenty-four players made at least one appearance in nationally organised first-team competition, and there were thirteen different goalscorers. Half backs Dick Neal and Johnny Watts played in 49 and 48 of the 52 first-team matches over the season, and Bunny Larkin finished as leading goalscorer with 23 goals in all competitions, of which 18 were scored in the league.

Football League First Division

League table (part)

FA Cup

Inter-Cities Fairs Cup

Appearances and goals

Players with name struck through and marked  left the club during the playing season.

See also
Birmingham City F.C. seasons

References
General
 
 
 Source for match dates and results: 
 Source for lineups, appearances, goalscorers and attendances: Matthews (2010), Complete Record, pp. 352–53, 473–74.
 Source for kit: 

Specific

Birmingham City F.C. seasons
Birmingham City